Ivory Coast will be participating at the 2020 Summer Paralympics in Tokyo, Japan, from 24 August to 5 September 2021. This will be their seventh consecutive appearance at the Summer Paralympics since 1996.

Competitors 
The following is the list of number of competitors participating in the Games:

Athletics 

Men's field

Women's track

Powerlifting

See also 
 Ivory Coast at the Paralympics
 Ivory Coast at the 2020 Summer Olympics

External links 
 Paralympics website

Nations at the 2020 Summer Paralympics
2020
Summer Paralympics